Do not confuse with John Salerne (died 1415)

John Salerne (died 1410), of Winchelsea, Sussex and New Romney, Kent, was an English politician.

He was Mayor of Winchelsea for 1407–1409 and elected a Member (MP) of the Parliament of England for New Romney in 1386, February 1388 and 1391, and for Winchelsea in 1402 and 1407.

References

14th-century births
1410 deaths
People from New Romney
English MPs 1386
English MPs February 1388
Mayors of Winchelsea
English MPs 1391
English MPs 1402
English MPs 1407
People from Winchelsea